Bullwinkle was a  tall, pile-supported fixed steel oil platform in the Gulf of Mexico. Installed in 1988, the total weight of the platform was 77,000 tons, of which the steel jacket comprises 49,375 tones. At the time of its construction it was the third tallest freestanding structure ever builtshorter than only the CN Tower and the Ostankino Towerand the tallest in the United States, being  taller than the pinnacle of the Sears Tower. Of the total height,  are below the waterline. Bullwinkle belongs to Fieldwood Energy LLC. The total field development construction cost was  according to some sources.

The jacket, i.e. the mainly submerged part of the platform, was built by Gulf Marine Fabricators in 1985–1988 at the North Yard location in Ingleside, Texas, at the intersection of the Corpus Christi Ship Channel and the Intracoastal Waterway in Port Aransas, east of Corpus Christi. The platform was shipped using a barge and installed by Heerema Marine Contractors. The jacket which is some 1,400 feet tall is the second tallest object to ever be moved to another position, relative to the surface of the Earth after the Troll A platform.

The Bullwinkle platform was the third tallest freestanding structure built in water after the Petronius and Baldpate Compliant Towers, but it was the tallest of these that could be built on land as is without any modifications.

In 2010, Superior Energy Services took ownership of the platform and planned to decommission it at the end of its economic life.

See also
List of tallest oil platforms
List of tallest freestanding steel structures
Offshore oil and gas in the US Gulf of Mexico
List of tallest freestanding structures

External links
 Info on offshore-technology.com
 Towing Largest Oil Rig in History, installation and construction video

References

Energy infrastructure completed in 1988
Oil platforms off the United States
Petroleum industry in the Gulf of Mexico
Energy infrastructure in Louisiana
1988 establishments in Louisiana